Hussein Isaac was a Syrian Armed Forces major general who held the positions of Director of Air Defense Administration of Homs and, later until his death, in Al-Malihah. He died during the Battle of Al-Malihah of his wounds on 18 May 2014, making him one of the few top-ranking generals killed in the conflict. The SOHR called his death an "important psychological blow" to the Assad government.

References 

Military personnel killed in the Syrian civil war
Syrian generals
Syrian military personnel killed in action
2014 deaths
Year of birth missing